Joan Lestor, Baroness Lestor of Eccles (13 November 1931 – 27 March 1998) was a British Labour politician.

Early life
Lestor was educated at Blaenavon Secondary School, Monmouth; William Morris High School, Walthamstow and the University of London. She became a nursery school teacher and a member of the Socialist Party of Great Britain, but resigned from the latter over the Turner Controversy. She became a councillor in 1958 on the Metropolitan Borough of Wandsworth and later the London Borough of Wandsworth. She served on London County Council, losing in Lewisham West at the 1961 election, but winning a by-election to represent Wandsworth Central from 1962 until 1964.

Parliamentary career
Lestor contested Lewisham West in 1964 and was elected Member of Parliament for Eton and Slough in 1966.

She was briefly a junior minister from 1969–70 with responsibility for nursery education. In March 1974 she became the Under-Secretary of State for Foreign and Commonwealth Affairs and in June 1975 moved back to Education as Under-Secretary of State, for Education and Science. In March 1976 she resigned over cuts.

Lestor was one of the founding editors of anti-fascist monthly, Searchlight, though that magazine had only a tenuous connection to the current publication.

After boundary changes in 1983, Lestor contested the new constituency of Slough but was defeated by the Conservative candidate John Watts. Neil Kinnock, who became leader of the Labour Party shortly after the election said he was "heartbroken" by Lestor's defeat. Lestor blamed the SDP for her defeat. No longer an MP, Lestor worked for the World Development Movement, campaigning for child welfare and setting up a unit to investigate child abuse, including sexual abuse, an area neglected by mainstream politicians at the time.

She was returned for Eccles in 1987, and held this seat until 1997. She served in the shadow cabinet between 1989 and 1996 firstly as Shadow Spokesperson for Children and Families and subsequently as Shadow Minister for Overseas Development. She resigned on 25 July 1996 after announcing that she was not seeking re-election at the next election.

House of Lords
On 4 June 1997, Lestor was created a life peer as Baroness Lestor of Eccles, of Tooting Bec in the London Borough of Wandsworth, nine months before her death from motor neuron disease.

References

External links 
 

1931 births
1998 deaths
Deaths from motor neuron disease
Neurological disease deaths in the United Kingdom
Labour Party (UK) MPs for English constituencies
Members of Wandsworth Metropolitan Borough Council
Councillors in the London Borough of Wandsworth
Members of London County Council
British humanitarians
Life peeresses created by Elizabeth II
Lestor of Eccles
Female members of the Parliament of the United Kingdom for English constituencies
Members of the Fabian Society
People from Slough
UK MPs 1966–1970
UK MPs 1970–1974
UK MPs 1974
UK MPs 1974–1979
UK MPs 1979–1983
UK MPs 1987–1992
UK MPs 1992–1997
Socialist Party of Great Britain members
Government and politics of Slough
Alumni of the University of London
Chairs of the Labour Party (UK)
Members of the Parliament of the United Kingdom for constituencies in Berkshire
Members of the Parliament of the United Kingdom for constituencies in Greater Manchester
20th-century British women politicians
Ministers in the Wilson governments, 1964–1970
20th-century English women
20th-century English people
Women councillors in England